Ayrton Drug Manufacturing Limited was a Ghanaian pharmaceutical company. It was established on September 24, 1965. The business entity was listed on the stock index of the Ghana Stock Exchange, the GSE All-Share Index.
The factory it ran is based in Tesano, a suburb of Accra. The company's product portfolio included anti-hypertensives, hematinics, dermatological preparations, antibiotics, dewormers, pain killers and anti-inflammatory drugs. In February 2010 Adcock Ingram, a South African pharmaceutical company acquired 66% shares in the company.

In January 2020, Ayrton Drug Manufacturing Limited and two other domestic pharmaceutical companies, Dannex Limited and Starwin Products Limited, had already merged and listed on the GSE as DAS Pharma.

References

External links
DAS Pharma official homepage
GhanaWeb.com
Ayrton Drugs at Alacrastore
Ayrton Drugs Stock Quote at Ghanastocks.net 

Pharmaceutical companies established in 1965
Pharmaceutical companies of Ghana
Manufacturing companies based in Accra
Companies listed on the Ghana Stock Exchange
Ghanaian brands